Bradley Walker Tomlin (August 19, 1899 – May 11, 1953) belonged to the generation of New York School Abstract Expressionist artists. He participated in the famous ‘’Ninth Street Show.’’ According to John I. H. Baur, Curator of the Whitney Museum of American Art, Tomlin’s "life and his work were marked by a persistent, restless striving toward perfection, in a truly classical sense of the word, towards that “inner logic” of form which would produce a total harmony, an unalterable rightness, a sense of miraculous completion...It was only during the last five years of his life that the goal was fully reached, and his art flowered with a sure strength and authority."

Biography
Born in Syracuse, New York, Tomlin was the youngest of four children. Beginning in high school he wanted to be an artist. His art teachers were Cornelia Moses, a former pupil of Arthur Wesley Dow, Hugo Gari Wagner for modeling, and Frank London, his mentor and teacher.

Tomlin attended  Syracuse University, College of Fine Arts, New York from 1917-1921, studying under Dr. Jeannette Scott and Professor Carl T. Hawley. He then attended Académie Colarossi and the Grande Chaumiѐre, in Paris from 1923–1924. He returned to New York in the late 1924. He began exhibiting in 1925 at the Whitney Studio Club. In 1926 Tomlin returned to Europe, visiting England, Italy and Switzerland, though staying mainly in Paris. He returned to the United States in July 1927. He also discovered Woodstock, New York where he spent his summers.

During the depression Tomlin worked in teaching positions at Sarah Lawrence College from 1932 - 1941, at Buckley School from 1932–1933, and at Dalton School from 1933–1934.
 
On Sunday, May 10, 1953, Tomlin drove with his friends to a party at the Jackson Pollocks’ house on Long Island, from which he returned about midnight, feeling ill. The following day, he was admitted to St. Vincent's Hospital where he suffered a heart attack and died at seven that night. Bradley Walker Tomlin died at the age of fifty-three.

Selected solo exhibitions
 1922: Skaneatele and Cazenovia, NY (watercolors)
 1925: Anderson Galleries, NY (watercolors)
 1926, 1927: Montross Gallery, NY
 1931, 1944: Frank K. M. Rehn Galleries, NY
1950, 1953: Betty Parsons Gallery, NY
 1955: Phillips Memorial Gallery, Washington, D.C.
 1957: “Bradley Walker Tomlin,” circ. Exhibition organized by the Art Galleries of the University of California, Los Angeles, in association with the  Whitney Museum of American Art’’
 2016: "Bradley Walker Tomlin: A Retrospective", Samuel Dorsky Museum of Art, August 31 – December 11, 2016, State University of New York at New Paltz

Selected group exhibitions
 1949, 1951: University of Illinois
 1951: 9th Street Art Exhibition, NYC
 1951: “Abstract Painting  and Sculpture in America,” Museum of Modern Art New York; University of Minnesota, Minneapolis MN
 1952: “Fifteen Americans,” Museum of Modern Art, New York;
 1953: Metropolitan Museum of Art, NYC; “Second Annual Exhibition of Painting and Sculpture Stable Gallery,” NYC
 1954-1955: “The New Decade,” Whitney Museum of American Art, NYC
 1955: Musée d’Art Moderne Paris, France
 1969: “New American Painting and Sculpture,”  Museum of Modern Art, New York
 2017: "Abstract Expressionnism", Guggenheim Museum Bilbao, Feb. - June 2017

See also
Art movement
Abstract Imagists
Abstract expressionism
New York School
Action painting

References

Sources
Research Information System; Archival, Manuscript and Photographic Collections, Bradley Walker Tomlin. Smithsonian Institution.

Books
 Marika Herskovic, American Abstract Expressionism of the 1950s An Illustrated Survey, (New York School Press, 2003.) . p. 338-341
 Marika Herskovic, New York School Abstract Expressionists Artists Choice by Artists, (New York School Press, 2000.) . p. 16; p. 38; p. 362-365
Müller-Yao, Marguerite Hui: Der Einfluß der Kunst der chinesischen Kalligraphie auf die westliche informelle Malerei, Diss. Bonn, Köln 1985.

External links
Bradley Walker Tomlin's paintings in the Museum of Modern Art, NY from MoMA.org

1899 births
1953 deaths
Abstract expressionist artists
20th-century American painters
American male painters
Modern painters
Painters from New York City
Artists from Syracuse, New York
Syracuse University alumni
Académie Colarossi alumni
Sarah Lawrence College faculty
20th-century American male artists